Tom Amone (born 19 December 1996) is an Australian professional rugby league footballer who plays as a  for the Leigh Centurions in the Betfred Championship.

He previously played for the South Sydney Rabbitohs and Wests Tigers in the National Rugby League.

Background
Amone was born in Westmead, New South Wales, Australia. Amone is of Tongan descent.

Playing career
Amone played for the Blacktown Workers Sea Eagles in the Intrust Super Premiership NSW for the 2018 season and gained the attention of South Sydney who signed him on a two-year deal beginning in 2019.

Amone made his NRL debut in round 14 of the 2019 NRL season for South Sydney in their 19-18 loss to the Penrith Panthers.

On 9 November 2020, Amone was released by South Sydney.

Leigh Centurions
On 1 Dec 2021 it was reported that he had signed for Leigh Centurions in the RFL Championship.

References

External Links
South Sydney Rabbitohs profile

1996 births
Living people
Australian expatriate sportspeople in England
Australian sportspeople of Samoan descent
Australian rugby league players
Leigh Leopards players
Rugby league players from Sydney
Rugby league props
South Sydney Rabbitohs players
Western Suburbs Magpies NSW Cup players
Wests Tigers players